Arnaud Gascon-Nadon (born July 10, 1988) is a former Canadian football defensive lineman  who played for the Edmonton Eskimos of the Canadian Football League (CFL) in 2018. He was selected 17th overall by the Tiger-Cats in the 2012 CFL Draft. After the 2011 CIS season, he was ranked as the 13th best player in the Canadian Football League's Amateur Scouting Bureau January rankings for players eligible in the 2012 CFL Draft, and ninth by players in Canadian Interuniversity Sport. Gascon-Nadon played CIS football with the Laval Rouge et Or and for the Rice University Owls in 2008.

Before playing for Edmonton, Gascon-Nadon was with the Hamilton Tiger Cats from 2013 to 2015 and with the Ottawa Red and Blacks in 2016 and 2017, winning the Grey Cup with them in 2016. He officially announced his retirement in the summer of 2019. He endorsed the Conservative Party of Quebec for the 2022 Quebec general election.

References

External links
Hamilton Tiger-Cats bio

1988 births
Canadian football defensive linemen
American football defensive linemen
Canadian players of American football
French Quebecers
Hamilton Tiger-Cats players
Rice Owls football players
Laval Rouge et Or football players
Living people
Players of Canadian football from Quebec
Canadian football people from Montreal